Porch Life is a 2003 hip hop album by Boston ska punk band Big D and the Kids Table.

Track listing
 Pizza Pie Intro (Part I) - 0:19
 Pizza Pie Intro (Part II) - 1:03
 Stove Top Free Style - 2:01 
 In Front Of Me (40's) - 4:02
 Muthafuckin' Big-D - 4:15
 JL a.m.m.i.'s Being Shot and Killed - 1:03
 Tommy Used to Be a Mothafucka Pimp Yo! - 3:52
 Skip Dogg and MC Wane Trial - 1:13
 Stupid Mizzind - 6:26
 Phatmothafucka - 3:15
 What! You Punk Mothafucka - 1:58
 51 (Live!) - 5:56
 Fire Stada - 1:25
 Cold Hard Cash - 1:00
 Ahh Big-D-ooh Big-D - 5:40
 I Wanna Touch That Bum, That Big Ol' Bum - 2:09
 It's Dat Trick - 3:34
 Skipp Dogg and MC Wane Got Trapped - 4:07
 Skully-B-Nuts Stereo Shit - 0:45
 Skully-B-Nuts' Ointment - 5:13
 I Wanna Touch That Bum, That Big Ol' Bum (Reprise) - 2:09
 It's Dat Trick (Reprise) - 3:34

2003 albums
Big D and the Kids Table albums